Chiangmai United Football Club (Thai: สโมสรฟุตบอลเชียงใหม่ ยูไนเต็ด) is a Thai professional football club based in Chiang Mai province, Thailand.

History
The club, originally named Changphueak Chiangmai, was founded in 2015. The club competed its first season in 2016 and won champion in the 2016 Thai Division 3 Tournament Northern Region and was promoted to Thai League 4 North Region. In 2017, the club was renamed to JL Chiangmai United with Jele as the team main sponsor.

In 2020, the club was renamed to Chiangmai United.

Sponsorship
The following are the sponsors of CMUTD (named "CMUTD Partners"):

Title sponsors

Main sponsors
 Moose
 Jele
 Thai Vietjet Air
 Grand Sport Group
 Palaad Tawanron
 Nuan Bakery

Crest history

Stadium and locations

Season-by-season record

Current squad

Out on loan

Coaches
Coaches by Years (2016–present)

  Chalongchai Leelahacheewa 
  Peerapat Pasithakarnkul 
  Apichart Mosika 
  Surachai Jirasirichote 
  Chusak Sriphum 
  Somchai Makmool 
  Leones Pereira dos Santos  
  Surachai Jirasirichote 
  Carlos Eduardo Parreira  
  Dennis Amato 
  Surapong Kongthep 
  Ailton Silva 
  Chusak Sriphum 
  Somchai Chuayboonchum 
  Wanderley Junior

Honours

Domestic leagues
 Thai League 2
 Runners-up (1): 2020–21
 Thai League 3
 Champions (1): 2018
 Thai League 3 Upper Region
 Champions (1): 2018
 Thai League 4 Northern Region
 Winners (1): 2017
 Football Division 3
 Winners (1): 2016

References

External links
 

Association football clubs established in 2015
Football clubs in Thailand
Sport in Chiang Mai
2015 establishments in Thailand
JL Chiangmai United F.C.